Joseph Chong (born 1922, date of death unknown) is a Malaysian former sports shooter. He competed in the 50 metre pistol event at the 1956 Summer Olympics.

References

External links
 

1922 births
Year of death missing
Malaysian male sport shooters
Olympic shooters of Malaya
Shooters at the 1956 Summer Olympics
Place of birth missing